Final Battle is a professional wrestling event, held annually by the Ring of Honor promotion. The event was initially held in 2002, and is traditionally ROH's last show in the calendar year. The 2009 edition of the show was ROH's first internet pay-per-view, and the first ROH show to be broadcast live. The 2010 edition and the 2011 edition were also broadcast live via the internet. Between 2006 and 2014, every event was held at either the Grand Ballroom or the Hammerstein Ballroom of the Manhattan Center in New York City. Final Battle has since become Ring of Honor's premiere flagship event, similar to WWE's WrestleMania.

Dates and venues

See also
All Out: the premier event produced by All Elite Wrestling
Bound for Glory: the premier event produced by Impact Wrestling
Wrestle Kingdom: the premier event produced by New Japan Pro-Wrestling
November to Remember: the premier event produced by Eastern Championship Wrestling/Extreme Championship Wrestling
Triplemanía: the premier event produced by Lucha Libre AAA Worldwide
WrestleMania: the premier event produced by WWE

References

External links 
 Ring of Honor's official site